Stefano d'Antonio di Vanni (c. 1405–1483) was an Italian Renaissance painter.

Not much is known about Stefano d'Antonio di Vanni's life except through his works. He was born in Florence, and his style puts him in the Florentine School. He primarily painted religious-themed works for local church commissions. He painted frescoes in the former refectory of the parish church of St. Andrea.  He also painted a number of altarpieces with Bicci di Lorenzo. 
He was an assistant of Bacci di Lorenzo and, later, one of his main collaborators.
He died in 1483. One of his works is part of the Courtauld Gallery collection.

Works
 Madonna with the Long Neck, Pinacothèque communale, Volterra
 Baptism of San Pancrazio, distemper on wood, 68,5x52 3 cm, Musée Bandini, Fiesole
 Annunciation, tempera and gold on wood (attribution) in collaboration with Bicci di Lorenzo
 Baptism of Christ, Nativity of Jesus, Museo Civico Amedeo Lia, La Spezia
 Last Supper', fresco, Parish Church of St Andrew, Cercina, Sesto Fiorentino
 Madonna of the Girdle'', fresco (v.1430) in collaboration with Bicci di Lorenzo

References

A. Padoa Rizzo e C. Frosinini, Stefano d’Antonio di Vanni (1405–1483): Opere e documenti, in “Antichità Viva", XXIII, 1984,no 4/5, pp. 5–33

1405 births
1483 deaths
15th-century Italian painters
Italian male painters
Painters from Florence
15th-century people of the Republic of Florence